Potamos tou Kampou is a small village in Cyprus, west of Karavostasi. De facto, it is under the control of Northern Cyprus. According to Cyprus Republic, is a quarter of Karavostasi.

References

Karavostasi
Populated places in Lefke District